Goniocaulon is a genus of flowering plants in the family Asteraceae.

Species
There is only one known species, Goniocaulon indicum,  native to India, Pakistan, Ethiopia, and Sudan.

References

Flora of Northeast Tropical Africa
Flora of the Indian subcontinent
Cynareae
Monotypic Asteraceae genera